The 31st Virginia Infantry Regiment was an infantry regiment raised in Virginia for service in the Confederate States Army during the American Civil War. It fought mostly as part of the Army of Northern Virginia.

The 31st Virginia was organized under William Lowther Jackson and mustered into Confederate service in July, 1861. The men were recruited primarily from the counties of Barbour, Marion, Pendleton, Harrison, Gilmer, Randolph, Pocahontas, Lewis, and Highland.

The unit was active in Lee's Cheat Mountain Campaign and Jackson's Valley operations. Later it was assigned to General Early's, W. Smith's, Pegram's, and J.A. Walker's Brigade, Army of Northern Virginia. The 31st participated in the difficult campaigns of the army from the Seven Days' Battles to Cold Harbor, then moved with Early to the Shenandoah Valley and was active around Appomattox.

This regiment reported 13 casualties at Greenbrier River, 37 at Camp Alleghany, 19 at McDowell, and 97 at Cross Keys and Port Republic. It lost 3 killed and 17 wounded at Cedar Mountain, had 5 killed and 20 wounded at Second Manassas, and suffered 1 killed and 7 wounded at Sharpsburg. Of the 267 in action at Gettysburg, ten percent were disabled. On April 9, 1865, it surrendered with 7 officers and 49 men of which 22 were armed.

The field officers were Colonels John S. Hoffman, William L. Jackson, and Samuel H. Reynolds; Lieutenant Colonels Francis M. Boykin, Alfred H. Jackson, and J.S. Kerr McCutchen; and Majors James C. Arbogast, Joseph H. Chenoweth, and William P. Cooper.

Companies
Company A, Marion Guard, Capt. William P. Thompson
Company B, Pendleton Minute Men, Capt. Robert H. Bradshaw
Company C, Harrison State Guards, Capt. Uriel M. Turner
Company D, Gilmer Rifles, Capt. John E. Mitchell
Company E, The Highlanders, Capt. Felix H. Hull
Company F, Capt. Jacob Currence (Randolph County)
Company G, Pocahontas Reserves, Capt. James C. Arbogast
Company H, Barbour Greys, Capt. Thomas A. Bradford
Company I, Capt. Alfred H. Jackson (Lewis County)
Company K, Barbour Mountain Guards, Capt. Henry Sturm

See also

List of Virginia Civil War units
List of West Virginia Civil War Confederate units

Notes

References

External links
Roy Bird Cook Collection, West Virginia University, 31st Virginia Infantry

Units and formations of the Confederate States Army from Virginia
1861 establishments in Virginia
Military units and formations established in 1861
1865 disestablishments in Virginia
Military units and formations disestablished in 1865